The 2017 Tour of Guangxi was a road cycling stage race that took place in China between 19 and 24 October 2017. It was the 1st edition of the Tour of Guangxi and was part of the 2017 UCI World Tour as a 2.UWT event.

Teams
Eighteen teams of up to seven riders started the race:

Route

Result

References

Tour of Guangxi
Tour of Guangxi
Tour of Guangxi
October 2017 sports events in China